is a passenger railway station in located in the city of  Wakayama, Wakayama Prefecture, Japan, operated by the private railway company Wakayama Electric Railway.

Lines
Tanakaguchi Station is served by the Kishigawa Line, and is located 0.6 kilometers from the terminus of the line at Wakayama Station.

Station layout
The station consists of one island platform with a level crossing. There is no station building and the station is unattended.

Adjacent stations

History
Tanakaguchi Station opened on June 15, 1924.

Passenger statistics

Surrounding Area
Wakayama Prefectural Office
Raigo-ji temple

See also
List of railway stations in Japan

References

External links
 
  Tanakaguchi Station timetable

Railway stations in Japan opened in 1924
Railway stations in Wakayama Prefecture
Wakayama (city)